In the sociology of religion, secondary conversion is the religious conversion of an individual that results from a relationship with another convert, rather than from any particular aspect of the new religion. For example, someone might join a religious group primarily because their spouse or partner has done so; such a person would be a secondary convert. Secondary converts are people who join a religion only because of a relationship with the other convert.

Secondary conversion can greatly expand a movement's influence, particularly after a conquest, such as the Muslim Moorish conquest of Spain and Catholic Spain's conquests in Latin America.

See also
 Deathbed conversion, done just before death
 Forced conversion, done under duress
 Marital conversion, religious conversion upon marriage outside of religion

References 

Sociology of religion